Paul Anxionnaz (31 December 1902 – 20 February 1997) was a French politician and Grand master of Grand Orient de France in 1964 and 1965.

Anxionnaz was born in Aime.  He represented the Radical Party in the National Assembly from 1946 to 1951 and from 1956 to 1958.

References

1902 births
1997 deaths
People from Savoie
French Freemasons
Politicians from Auvergne-Rhône-Alpes
Radical Party (France) politicians
Deputies of the 1st National Assembly of the French Fourth Republic
Deputies of the 3rd National Assembly of the French Fourth Republic
Commandeurs of the Légion d'honneur